The Murree vole (Hyperacrius wynnei) is a species of rodent in the family Cricetidae. It is endemic to the Himalayas in Pakistan and India. It was named by William Thomas Blanford after its collector, geologist Arthur Beavor Wynne.

Distribution
It is confined to the Himalayas of northern India and Pakistan (including Murree Hills, Kaghan Valley and Swat Valley).

References

Musser, G. G. and M. D. Carleton. 2005. Superfamily Muroidea. pp. 894–1531 in Mammal Species of the World a Taxonomic and Geographic Reference. D. E. Wilson and D. M. Reeder eds. Johns Hopkins University Press, Baltimore.

Hyperacrius
Rodents of India
Rodents of Pakistan
Murree
Mammals described in 1881
Taxa named by William Thomas Blanford
Taxonomy articles created by Polbot